Rebecca Evans may refer to:
 Rebecca Evans (soprano) (born 1963), Welsh operatic soprano
 Rebecca Evans (politician) (born 1976), Welsh politician